Valea Mare de Criş may refer to several villages in Romania:

 Valea Mare de Criş, a village in Borod Commune, Bihor County
 Valea Mare de Criş, a village in Tomeşti Commune, Hunedoara County